Another Man's Shoes is a 1913 comedy novel by the British writer Victor Bridges.

Adaptations
It was made into a 1916 American silent film The Phantom Buccaneer directed by J. Charles Haydon and starring Richard Travers. A second American version Another Man's Shoes was produced in 1922, directed by Jack Conway and starring  Herbert Rawlinson and Barbara Bedford.

References

Bibliography
 Goble, Alan. The Complete Index to Literary Sources in Film. Walter de Gruyter, 1999.
 Reilly, John M. Twentieth Century Crime & Mystery Writers. Springer, 2015.

1913 British novels
British comedy novels
British novels adapted into films
 Novels by Victor Bridges
Hodder & Stoughton books
Novels set in London